Harrow International School may refer to:
Harrow International School Bangkok
Harrow International School Beijing
Harrow International School Hong Kong